Anaphes is a genus of fairyflies belonging to the family Mymaridae. It was first described by Alexander Henry Haliday in 1833.

The genus has a cosmopolitan distribution.

Species 
Species in the genus include:

References

Mymaridae